Westlake University is a private research university in Hangzhou, Zhejiang, China, founded in October 2018.

Westlake University is often being described as “Caltech of China” or "China's Caltech".

Westlake University ranked 84th in the world for Nature Index 2021 Young Universities (Leading 150 Young Universities) and 92nd in China for Nature Index 2022.

History 
The proposal for the creation of a private research university was submitted on March 11, 2015. The proposers were from business and academia, and included Shi Yigong, Chen Shiyi, and Pan Jianwei. This led to the creation of WIAS on December 10, 2016 with Shi as president. The Ministry of Education approved the foundation of a university on April 2, 2018. Shi was elected as the university's president at the first board meeting on April 16.

The university was inaugurated in Hangzhou on October 20, 2018. It opened with the Yunqi campus; the Yungu campus began construction in April.

Governance System

Westlake University Communist Party Committee  
On April 20, 2018, the Communist Party Committee of West Lake University was formally established. Dong Qingyuan was named the Communist Party Secretary, Sun Youyou the Deputy Secretary, and Yang Wenzhu the Secretary of the Disciplinary Committee of the University.

Westlake University Board of Trustees 
Westlake University is headed by the University President under the guidance of the Board of Trustees. The Board of Trustees consists of educators and scholars from China and overseas, representatives of donors and representatives of the government, making decisions on major issues such as the strategic planning of the university. It also appoints the University President which executes the decisions of the Board of Trustees.

 Honorary Chair: Yang Chen-Ning, Nobel Laureate in Physics and Academician of the Chinese Academy of Sciences
 Chair: Yingyi Qian, Dean of the School of Economics and Management and Professor at Tsinghua University

Administration 

The University President is Shi Yigong and its Vice Presidents include Tian Xu, Min Qiu, Xiaoyun Zhu and Qingke Ji.

Academics 
The university's faculties are the School of Life Science, School of Science and the School of Engineering.

Rankings and reputation

Nature Index 
Nature Index tracks the affiliations of high-quality scientific articles and presents research outputs by institution and country on monthly basis.

Campus and Campus Life 
Westlake University is located in Xihu District, Hangzhou, Zhejiang Province in China.

Yungu Campus (Main Campus) 

The Yungu Campus is located in the Yungu Block of Zijingang Science and Technology City in Xihu District. The circular center of the campus is the "academic loop" for the university's administrative and academic heart, including a large "c"-shaped faculty building. The "residential loop" fills the campus perimeter, and contains residences and other personnel support facilities. The loops are separated by a moat crossed by 12 bridges.

Yunqi Campus 

The Yunqi Campus is located in Yunqi Town, in the southern part of Xihu District of Hangzhou, Zhejiang Province, China. This interim campus satisfies the basic needs of Westlake University in its initial stages.

Covering an area of 11.5 acres with a total construction space of 106,000 m2, the Yunqi Campus consists of four research buildings, one administrative building and two student residence halls, which were put into operation in March 2017. The Yunqi Campus features a small sports field with a basketball court and fitness equipment, a gym, a two-floor dining hall, a café and a campus store. Furthermore, a running track along the campus border has been laid in 2019. Regular leisure activities are organized by different clubs, the Union of Faculty and Staff and the Office of Academic Services and Student Affairs.

References 

Educational institutions established in 2018
Universities and colleges in Hangzhou
Universities and colleges in Zhejiang
Private universities and colleges
2018 establishments in China